Salami slicing tactics, also known as salami slicing, salami tactics, the salami-slice strategy, or salami attacks, is the practice of using a series of many small actions to produce a much larger action or result that would be difficult or unlawful to perform all at once.

Politically, the term is used to describe a divide and conquer process of threats and alliances used to overcome opposition. With it, an aggressor can influence and eventually dominate a landscape, typically political, in piecemeal fashion. Opposition is eliminated "slice by slice" until its members realize, usually too late, that it has been virtually neutralized in its entirety. In some cases, the tactics include the creation of several factions within an opposing political party, followed by its dismantling from the inside, without giving the affected parties the opportunity to protest or react. Salami tactics are most likely to succeed when its perpetrators keep their true long-term motives hidden and maintain a posture of cooperativeness and helpfulness while engaged in gradual subversion.

Financially, the term "salami attack" is used to describe schemes by which large sums are fraudulently accumulated by repeated transfers of imperceptibly small sums of money.

Origins
It was commonly believed that the term salami tactics was coined in the late 1940s by Stalinist dictator Mátyás Rákosi to describe the actions of the Hungarian Communist Party in its ultimately successful drive for complete power in Hungary. Noting that "salami, an expensive food, is not eaten all at once, but is cut one slice at a time," Rákosi claimed he destroyed Hungary's leading, center-right, Smallholders' Party through a "step-by-step approach ... known as the 'Salami tactic,' and thanks to it we were able, day after day, to slice off, to cut up the reactionary forces skulking in the Smallholders' Party." By portraying his opponents as fascists (or at the very least fascist sympathizers), Rákosi was able to get the opposition to push out its own right wing, then its center, then most of its left wing, leaving only  "fellow travellers" willing to collaborate with the Communists.

However, according to historian Norman Stone, the term might have been invented by Hungarian Independence Party leader Zoltán Pfeiffer, a hardline anti-communist opponent of Rákosi.

Thomas C. Schelling wrote in his 1966 book Arms and Influence:

Financial schemes
Computerized banking systems make it possible to repeatedly divert tiny amounts of money, typically due to rounding off, to a beneficiary's account. This general concept is used in popular automatic-savings apps. It has also been said to be behind fraudulent schemes, whereby bank transactions calculated to the nearest smallest unit of currency leave unaccounted-for fractions of a unit, for fraudsters to divert into other amounts. Snopes in 2001 dismissed the fact of such embezzlement schemes as a legend. 

In Los Angeles, in October 1998, district attorneys charged four men with fraud for allegedly installing computer chips in gasoline pumps that cheated consumers by overstating the amounts pumped.

In 2008, a man was arrested for fraudulently creating 58,000 accounts which he used to collect money through verification deposits from online brokerage firms, a few cents at a time.

In 1996, a fare box serviceman in Edmonton, Canada, was sentenced to four years' imprisonment for stealing coins from the city's transit agency fare boxes. Over 13 years, he stole 37 tonnes of coins, with a face value of nearly million, using a magnet to lift the coins (made primarily of steel or nickel at the time) out of the fare boxes one at a time.

In Buffalo, New York, a fare box serviceman stole more than US$200,000 in quarters from the local transit agency over an eight-year period stretching from 2003 to 2011, and was sentenced to thirty months in prison.

China's salami slice strategy 

The European Parliament Think Tank has accused China of using the salami slice strategy to gradually increase its presence in the South China Sea.

Salami slicing in scientific publishing 

Scientists are often evaluated by a number of papers published and similar criteria. In this context, salami slicing refers to "fragmenting single coherent bodies of research into as many publications as possible". If the fragment is too small it may be too hard to publish, so this includes forming minimal publishable items. It can be harder to collect, digest, understand and evaluate the research when scattered in a number of sources. It also leads to repetitive descriptions of context, bibliography lists and so on. Regarding that it is costly to scientific dissemination process, it is often considered a bad practice or even unethical. Some authors managed to divide the research to the extremal proportions. Salami slicing "can result in a distortion of the literature by leading unsuspecting readers to believe that data presented in each salami slice (i.e., journal article) is derived from a different subject sample".

Cultural references

Film
In the 2016 film Arrival, Agent Halpern mentions a Hungarian word meaning to eliminate your enemies one by one. It is thought that this alludes to szalámitaktika.

Salami slicing has played a key role in the plots of several films, including Hackers, Superman III, and Office Space. In the latter film, the characters reference Superman III as inspiration.

Television
Salami tactics are discussed by the British Chief Scientific Adviser in the Yes, Prime Minister episode, "The Grand Design".

In a 1972 episode of the TV series M*A*S*H, Radar attempts to ship an entire Jeep home from Korea one piece at a time. Hawkeye commented that his mailman "would have a retroactive hernia" if he found out. The 1987 TV movie Perry Mason: The Case of the Murdered Madam features a murder trial involving the transfer of fractional cents by bank employees.

Music
Johnny Cash's "One Piece at a Time" has a similar plot to the aforementioned M*A*S*H episode, but with a Cadillac made up of parts spanning model years 1949 through 1973.

See also
 Death by a thousand cuts
 Defeat in detail
 Divide and rule
 Embrace, extend, and extinguish

 First they came ...
 Gradualism
 Slippery slope
 Structuring

References

Further reading
 Horvath, John. 2000. Salami Tactics, Telepolis, at Heise.de online. Retrieved July 11, 2005.
 Salami tactics - Central and Eastern Europe 1945-8

1940s in Hungary
Political repression
Political terminology